Pioneer High School (known as Pioneer High or PHS or Pioneer) is a high school located in Woodland, California, United States. It is one of two high schools in the Woodland Joint Unified School District, providing a school for grades nine through twelve. As of the 2015–2016 school year, it had a population of approximately 1500-1600 students enrolled. It is the newest high school in Woodland, opened in 2003. The school mascot is a patriot (a revolutionary minuteman). The school serves a primarily agricultural-based community with mostly middle-class families. Major employers in the community include healthcare, warehouses, and agriculture. Both Pioneer High School and Woodland High School draw students from two public middle schools and private schools that are located in Woodland.

History
Pioneer High School was built in 2002-2003 and was in the final stages of completion when it opened for 9th and 10th graders on September 2, 2003. PHS is the second comprehensive high school in the Woodland Joint Unified School District and is accredited through the Western Association of Schools and Colleges. The first graduating class was in 2006, and the first four-year graduating class was in 2007.

Graduation requirements
High School graduation requirements in the Woodland Joint Unified School District include eight semesters of English, two semesters of foreign language or two semesters of fine art, six semesters of math, including one full year of Algebra, four semesters of science, six semesters of social science, one semester of state requirements (health), and four semesters of physical education, plus electives, for a total of 230 units.  Students are also required to complete 40 hours of community service.

See also 
 Woodland, California

References

External links 
 Official website

Educational institutions established in 2003
High schools in Yolo County, California
Public high schools in California
Buildings and structures in Woodland, California
2003 establishments in California